is a mountain of the Akaishi Mountains, located on the border of Hokuto in Yamanashi Prefecture, and Ina in Nagano Prefecture, in the Chūbu region of Japan.

Geography
Mount Kaikoma is protected within Minami Alps National Park. It is one of the landmark "100 Famous Japanese Mountains."

Mount Kaikoma is referred to as the eastern of the two mountains, while Mount Kisokoma is referred to as the western one. The top of the mountain appears white, because of the many white granite rock outcrops at the top of the mountain

Features
Mount Kaikoma is one of the centers of Japanese Shugendo in the region.

There are 18 or more mountains in Japan that are referred to as the "Komagatake (Koma Mountains)" (駒ヶ岳 Koma-ga-take).

The Ina Valley is located between Mount Kaikoma and Mount Kisokoma. Marishiten peak (摩利支天) is to the southeast.

Rivers
Rivers with headwaters on Mount Kaikoma include: 
 a tributary of Fuji River
 a tributary of Tenryū River

Mountaineering

Routes 
The most popular route to climb this mountain is from Kitazawa Pass on Minami Alps Gravel Road. It takes four and half hours from the pass to the top.

The other major route is a traditional one on Kuroto-One, it takes eight hours to the top.

Mountain hut and campsite 
There are mountain huts on Mount Kaikoma, that are opened during the mountain climbing season. There also are some specified campsites. A large one around "Kitazawa-Tōge (北沢峠)" is used as base camp for climbing Mount Kaikoma and Mount Senjō.

Nearby mountains

It is on the main ridge line in the northern part of the Akaishi Mountains.

Gallery

See also 

 100 Famous Japanese Mountains
 Akaishi Mountains
 Minami Alps National Park
 Komagatake

References

External links 
 the Geographical Survey Institute in Japan
 ‘Kitadake Kaikomagatake Minami Arupusu 2008’

Akaishi Mountains
Mount Kaikoma
Mountains of Nagano Prefecture
Mountains of Yamanashi Prefecture
Mount Kaikoma